Sir Terence Henderson McCombs  (5 September 1905 – 6 November 1982) was a New Zealand politician of the Labour Party, a High Commissioner, and the first principal of Cashmere High School.

Biography

Early life
McCombs was born in 1905 and received his early education at Fendalton School. He was further educated at Christchurch Boys' High School and Waitaki Boys' High School before graduating from Canterbury University College with MSc(Hons) in chemistry in 1929. He won two research scholarships in chemistry and was hoping to obtain a post in the Department of Scientific and Industrial Research (DSIR) but at the time, due to the Great Depression, the DSIR was not hiring any new staff. Instead he was appointed as a teacher at Seddon Memorial Technical College in Auckland in 1934.

Member of Parliament
 
 
 
 
 
 
 
 
Following his mother's death, McCombs was selected as her replacement as the Labour Party candidate for the Lyttelton electorate. He was elected and represented Lyttelton from the 1935 by-election until he was defeated in the bitter 1951 election. In 1936, McCombs was appointed to the Canterbury University College Council, and he remained a member until 1947, when he became Minister of Education. From 1938 to 1947 he was a member of the Lyttelton Harbour Board.

From 1945 to 1947 he was Under-Secretary to Walter Nash, the Minister of Finance. He was Minister of Education and Minister for Science and Industrial Research from 1947 to 1949, near the end of the term of the First Labour Government. As Minister of Education, he was involved on behalf of the Government in the purchase of the Ilam campus for the university. In the centennial history of the university, it is stated that "Canterbury has never enjoyed greater ministerial support than it did from McCombs".

Following the defeat of the Labour government McCombs was nominated to stand for the deputy leadership in January 1951 following the death of Peter Fraser. He polled second in the caucus ballot with seven votes, compared to Jerry Skinner with twenty-two and two votes to Fred Hackett.

Post-parliamentary career
At the 1950 local-body elections he was elected a member of the Christchurch City Council. Re-elected in 1953, he did not stand for a third term in 1956.

After his parliamentary defeat in 1951, McCombs returned to teaching. In 1956, he became the founding headmaster of Cashmere High School in Christchurch. In 1957, he again became a member of the University of Canterbury Council (the name of which Canterbury University College had been changed to). He was Chancellor of the University of Canterbury from 1968 to 1971. He was a member of Rotary International and belonged to the Christchurch South club, of which he was the district governor of in 1967.

From 1973 to 1975 he was New Zealand's High Commissioner to the United Kingdom. After being recalled early from his posting to London, to ease the retirement of outgoing Deputy Prime Minister Hugh Watt, he was appointed chairman of the Committee on Secondary Schools from 1975 to 1976.

In 1977 he began a second spell on the Christchurch City Council, elected in the Eastern Ward. He was appointed chairman of the council's town-planning committee. He gained a wealth of knowledge on the subject of planning and the complex laws that governed it and, according to Deputy Mayor Rex Lester, he "...always seemed to have the uncanny ability in coming up with the right decision." After Labour won a majority on the city council in 1980, McCombs was speculated as a possible Deputy Mayor, but he was not interested in the job and happy to make way for Lester who, unlike McCombs, had mayoral ambitions.

Death
He died on 6 November 1982 in Kawakawa hospital, aged 77, while on a holiday in Northland. He was survived by his second wife, four sons and a daughter. He was buried at Waimairi Cemetery in Christchurch.

Awards and recognition
McCombs was appointed an Officer of the Order of the British Empire, for services to education, in the 1971 Queen's Birthday Honours and a Knight Bachelor in April 1975.

Family
His parents, Elizabeth McCombs (née Henderson) and James McCombs, were both socialists.

In 1935 he married Beryl Lavinia Butterick. Beryl died in 1952, and as a result McCombs became a solo parent with four school-age children. He was later remarried to Christina Mary Tulloch in 1955. His second wife, Christina, Lady McCombs, was awarded the Queen's Service Medal for community service in the 2007 New Year Honours. She died in Christchurch on 13 August 2016, aged 99 years.

Notes

References

|-

1905 births
1982 deaths
New Zealand Labour Party MPs
Members of the Cabinet of New Zealand
Heads of schools in New Zealand
People educated at Christchurch Boys' High School
People educated at Waitaki Boys' High School
University of Canterbury alumni
New Zealand MPs for Christchurch electorates
High Commissioners of New Zealand to the United Kingdom
New Zealand education ministers
Members of the New Zealand House of Representatives
Chancellors of the University of Canterbury
New Zealand Officers of the Order of the British Empire
New Zealand Knights Bachelor
Unsuccessful candidates in the 1951 New Zealand general election
Burials at Waimairi Cemetery
Christchurch City Councillors
New Zealand politicians awarded knighthoods
Lyttelton Harbour Board members